Paul Kettl (born July 15, 1954) is an American geriatric psychiatrist. He worked as the former chair of psychiatry at the Pennsylvania State University College of Medicine. His work has contributed to media violence research.

Politics
He ran for a seat in the United States House of Representatives in 1996 as a Democrat, but lost with 28% of the vote.

Write-in and minor candidate notes: 27 votes.

References

Living people
American psychiatrists
Pennsylvania State University faculty
1954 births